The Mara River is a river in that begins in Narok County (Kenya) and in ends in Mara Region (Tanzania), and lies across the migration path of ungulates in the Maasai Mara/Serengeti ecosystem.

The River's Flow
The Mara River basin covers a surface of 13,504 km2, of which approximately 65% is located in Kenya and 35% in Tanzania. From its sources in the Kenyan highlands, the river flows for about 395 km and originates from the Mau Escarpment and drains into Lake Victoria. The basin can be roughly divided into four land use and/or administrative units.

The Mara's Regions

The Mau Escarpment: The Mara River originates from the Napuiyapi swamp (2932 m), with the main perennial tributaries being the Amala and the Nyangores, which drain from the western Mau Escarpment. This part of the basin supports besides forests, both small-scale agriculture (less than 10 acres) and medium-size farms (often tea farms up to 40 acres).

The Kenyan Rangelands: In this area, the Amala and Nyangores rivers flow out of the Mau Escarpment and converge to form the Mara River. The river then meanders further through open savannah grasslands that is mostly governed by Maasai group ranches and used as pasture for livestock and for both small — and large-scale agriculture (more than 40 acres). The basins of four important tributaries to the Mara (the Talek, Engare, Sand and Engito rivers) are also located in this area, together with some upland areas like the Loita Hills.

The Protected areas: Eventually the river flows into the world-famous Masai Mara National Reserve, where it merges with three of the four mentioned tributaries. On the Kenyan-Tanzanian border, the river flows into the Serengeti National Park and is joined by the fourth major tributary: the Sand (or Longaianiet) River. In these wildlife parks human activity is restricted to wildlife viewing.

Downstream in Mara Region Tanzania: Just after the Mara River flows out of Ikorongo Game Reserve (which borders Serengeti National Park) it meanders sharply northwards. At the location where the river meanders into the southwestern direction again the main channel is lost in different streams, which feed the downstream  Mara Wetlands. These streams and wetlands continue for about 70 kilometres downstream. In this part of the basin human and livestock densities are high and small-scale subsistence agriculture is the main land use. The Mara River basin is one of the ten drainage basins that feed into Lake Victoria, and is therefore functionally and ecologically related to the socio-economic activities in Lake Victoria and along the River Nile.

Altitudes and Ranges

The altitudes in the basin range from 2,932 m around the sources in the Mau Escarpment to 1,134 m around Lake Victoria. The amount of precipitation varies according to these altitudes. The Mau Escarpment receives most rainfall with a mean annual rainfall between 1,000 and 1,750 mm. The transboundary middle savannah grasslands receive an average between 900 and 1,000 mm, and the Kenyan lower Loita hills and the area around Lake Victoria only about 700 and 850 mm rain per year. On top of this rainfall variability in space, the region is also known for its rainfall variability in time, which means that the different areas all receive variable amounts of rainfall over the year. The rainfall seasons are bi-modal, with the long rains starting in mid-March to June with a peak in April, while the short rains occur between September and December.

The Mara's Effects
The river is a vital source to grazing animals within the reserve. Although during the dry season it may often appear shallow, it may swell to up to twice its normal size after heavy rainfall. This can create rapids in the river, which may lead to shortage of food for predators that cannot cross the river to hunt.

See also 
 Nile River
 Nzoia River
 Yala River
 Nyando River
 Maasai Mara
 Serengeti National Park
 Mara Region
 Narok County

References

External links 

 gabepalacio.com: Mara River virtual Tour (requires QuickTime plugin)
 The Mara Triangle The Mara River defines the boundaries of the Mara Triangle in the Masai Mara
 Serengeti Mara River flows from Masai Mara into Serengeti

Rivers of Kenya
Rivers of Tanzania
International rivers of Africa
Tributaries of Lake Victoria
Geography of Mara Region